Hacalı is a Turkish place name and it may refer to;

Hocalı, Manavgat - a village in Manavgat district of Antalya Province
Hocalı, Mut -  a village in Mut district of Mersin Province

See also
Khojali